Mariosousa dolichostachya is a species of flowering plant in the family Fabaceae. It is found in Guatemala and Mexico. It is threatened by habitat loss.

References

dolichostachya
Flora of Guatemala
Flora of Mexico
Near threatened plants
Taxonomy articles created by Polbot